Edward Elliot may refer to:

 Edward Elliot (judge) (died 1866), judge in colonial Madras
 Edward Elliot (architect) (1828–1901), Canadian architect
 Edward Locke Elliot (1850–?), British Army general in India
 Edward Hay Mackenzie Elliot, British soldier and private secretary
 Rev. Edward B. Elliott, author of Horæ Apocalypticæ

See also
Edward Eliot (disambiguation)
Edward Elliott (disambiguation)